Henry Somerset, 2nd Earl of Worcester (26 November 1549) was an English nobleman. He was the son of Charles Somerset, 1st Earl of Worcester and Elizabeth Herbert, 3rd Baroness Herbert. On his father's death on 15 April 1526, he succeeded as the second Earl of Worcester. From his mother, he inherited the title of Baron Herbert.

He was invested as a Knight on 1 November 1523 in Roye, France, by the Duke of Suffolk.
 
Somerset obtained Tintern Abbey after the Dissolution of the Monasteries.

Family 
He married twice:
 Firstly, by papal dispensation dated 15 June 1514, to Lady Margaret Courtenay, daughter of William Courtenay, 1st Earl of Devon, by Catherine of York, daughter of Edward IV, King of England.  Margaret died before 15 April 1526. Some sources say the union produced no children. 
 Secondly, before 1527, to Elizabeth Browne, daughter of Anthony Browne, Knt., by Lucy, daughter of John Neville, 1st Marquess of Montagu. Somerset died on 26 November 1549. The children of Henry Somerset and Elizabeth Browne were:
 Lady Lucy Somerset (152423 February 1583) who married John Neville, 4th Baron Latimer.
 William Somerset, 3rd Earl of Worcester (c. 1526/721 February 1589). Heir and successor of his father.
 Francis Somerset (By 153222 July 1563), often said to have died at the battle of Pinkie in 1547, but fought at the siege of Leith in 1560, and was Member of Parliament for Monmouthshire, 1558. He was killed in an attack on Le Havre in 1563
 Charles Somerset
 Thomas Somerset.
 Lady Anne Somerset (died 17 October 1596), married Thomas Percy, 7th Earl of Northumberland. Her husband was beheaded on 22 August 1572. They had four daughters and one son (died young).	
 Lady Eleanor Somerset, married Henry Johns
 Lady Joan or "Jane" Somerset married Sir Edward Mansel.

Ancestry

References

General
 G. E. Cokayne. The Complete Peerage of England, Scotland, Ireland, Great Britain, and the United Kingdom, Vol. VIII, G. Bell & sons, 1898. pg 200. Google eBook
 Burke, John, Burke's genealogical and heraldic history of peerage, baronetage and knightage, G. P. Putnam's Sons: New York, 1914.
 Questier, Michael C., Catholicism and community in early modern England, Cambridge University Press, 2006.

02
04
Worcester, Henry Somerset, 2nd Earl of
Worcester, Henry Somerset, 2nd Earl of
H
16th-century English nobility
Knights Bachelor